The Far East Children's Railway (Russian: Дальневосточная детская железная дорога, Dalwenostotschnaja detskaja schelesnaja doroga) is a narrow gauge miniature railway in the Russian town of Khabarovsk. The railway was opened on  19 May 1958 as one of many pioneer railways in the USSR and is still in use.

History 

The railway was built by volunteers, after it had been initiated by Komsomol and the public. It was inaugurated on 19 May 1958.

Initially, a circular loop with a length of  surrounded the park of a Sovkhoz. The passengers were transported by a railbus and four open wooden body carriages with 15 seats each. The rails were of Type P-18.

The railbus was replaced by a steam locomotive Type 159 with serial number 6421 in 1959. It is displayed on a plinth at the Pionerskaja railway station. In 1965, four Polish metal passenger cars with 38 seats each were delivered by Pafawag.

The Pionerskaja railway station was built in 1967, approximately 600 m from the main track. The steam locomotive was replaced in 1968 by a ТУ2 diesel locomotive. The station building was built in 1972. On the ground floor it houses offices, a workshop, a waiting room and a classroom equipped with visual aids.

A maintenance depot with a pit was built in 1979. The Pafawag carriages were replaced in 1986 by carriages of type PV51 by the Russian Demikhovo Machinebuilding Plant, and from 1987 more modern ТУ7 diesel locomotives were used.

In 1999 the children's railway was reconstructed. The first refurbishment phase was completed on 25 May 2000. A repair and training building was erected near the Pionerskaja railway station, the 3A rails were replaced by heavier R-50 rails and signal and communications systems were upgraded.

Rolling stock

Locomotives 
The following diesel locomotives are currently being used:

 TU7 diesel locomotives – № 2611 and 2612
 TU10 diesel locomotive – № TU10-017

Carriages 
Three passenger carriages VP750, six metal-framed passenger carriages PV51 and four flatbed goods waggons are operational.

References

Children's railways
Rail transport in the Russian Far East
Passenger rail transport in Russia
750 mm gauge railways in Russia
Khabarovsk
Railway lines opened in 1958